The 1884 Invercargill mayoral election was held on 26 November 1884.

George Froggatt was elected mayor for the first time. His opponent, David Roche, would be elected mayor two years later in 1886.

Results
The following table gives the election results:

References

1884 elections in New Zealand
Mayoral elections in Invercargill